Mount Vanderheyden is a 2,120 m tall mountain standing 1.5 nautical miles (2.8 km) northeast of Mount Bastin on the north side of the Belgica Mountains. It was discovered by the Belgian Antarctic Expedition, 1957–58, under G. de Gerlache. He named it for Henri Vanderheyden, an aircraft mechanic with the expedition.

Mountains of Queen Maud Land
Princess Ragnhild Coast